The Glittering Days is the 17th co-production of MediaCorp TV and ntv7.
It will be aired every Monday to Thursday, at 10:00pm on Malaysia's ntv7 starting 20 April 2013. It stars Felicia Chin, Mimi Kung, William San & Jeffrey Cheng as casts of this series. It was later shown on MediaCorp Channel 8 in Singapore from 18 February to 29 March 2013 on weekdays at 7pm. This series was repeated on weekends 4:30pm in 2014 and Sundays at 12pm in 2020.

Cast
 Felicia Chin as Xu Wen Hui
 Mimi Kung as Su Xiao Xiao
 William San as Su Qing Yun
 Chris Tong as Chen Bo Li
 Jeffrey Cheng as Huang Da Wei

See also
 List of The Glittering Days episodes

References

Chinese-language drama television series in Malaysia
2010 Malaysian television series debuts
2010 Malaysian television series endings
NTV7 original programming
Channel 8 (Singapore) original programming